The Naval Ocean Surveillance System (NOSS) is a series of signals-intelligence satellites that have conducted electronic signals intelligence for the U.S. Navy since the early 1970s. The first series of satellites were codenamed "White Cloud" or "PARCAE", while second- and third-generation satellites have used the codenames "Ranger" and "Intruder".

The system is operated by the United States Navy, and its main purpose was tactical geolocation of Soviet Navy assets during the Cold War. NOSS involves satellite clusters operating in low Earth orbit to detect radar and other electronic transmissions from ships at sea and locate them using the time difference of arrival technique.

Satellites 

* One satellite from each third generation pair is officially catalogued as debris.

Cost 
The costs of the NOSS satellites (excluding costs for the launch vehicle), which were destroyed in a Titan IV launch failure in 1993, were US$800 million (inflation adjusted US$  billion in ).

See also 
 Poppy (satellite)
 Yaogan
 CERES (satellite)

References

External links 
 NOSS @ astronautix.com
 BBC - h2g2 - Naval Ocean Surveillance Satellites - a 'UFO'

Reconnaissance satellites of the United States
Signals intelligence satellites
Military space program of the United States
Satellite series
Military equipment introduced in the 1970s
Derelict satellites orbiting Earth